The New South Wales Rugby League (NSWRL) is the governing body of rugby league in New South Wales and the Australian Capital Territory and is a member of the Australian Rugby League Commission. It was formed in Sydney on 8 August 1907 and was known as the New South Wales Rugby Football League (NSWRFL) until 1984. From 1908 to 1994, the NSWRL ran Sydney's, then New South Wales', and eventually Australia's top-level rugby league club competition from their headquarters (or "Bunker" as it was nicknamed during the Super League war) on Phillip Street, Sydney. The organisation is responsible for administering the New South Wales rugby league team.

New South Wales Rugby League clubs

Current New South Wales members

The following clubs are the direct full member clubs of the NSWRL.

NSWRL

The New South Wales Rugby Football League was responsible for the introduction of rugby league into New South Wales in 1907. Since that time the NSWRFL has built a rich tradition at all levels of the game. Great names and great games illuminate the League's growth since 1907 up to the present day. The NSWRFL was formed in August 1907, when player discontent with the administration of the New South Wales Rugby Union, over rejection of compensation payments for injuries and lost wages, led to a breakaway movement. Key figures in the new movement were James Joseph Giltinan, legendary cricketer Victor Trumper, Alex Burdon, Peter Moir, Labor politician Henry Hoyle, George Brackenreg and Jack Feneley. The first rugby league game in New South Wales was played on 17 August 1907, in which New Zealand defeated New South Wales Rugby League team 12–8.

The Sydney premiership was started on 20 April 1908. Nine teams contested the initial season. They were:

 Balmain Tigers
 Cumberland Fruitpickers
 Eastern Suburbs Roosters
 Glebe Dirty Reds
 Newcastle Rebels
 Newtown Jets
 North Sydney Bears
 Western Suburbs Magpies
 South Sydney Rabbitohs

The NSWRFL premiership was continued on the successful basis of the first competition in 1908. In 1929 Jersey Flegg was appointed to the position of president of the NSWRFL and in 1941 he became chairman of the Australian Rugby League Board of Control. At the time of his death in 1960, aged 82, he was still serving in these roles.

When NSWRFL president Flegg died in 1960, Bill Buckley replaced him and also became boss of the Australian Rugby League, a position he remained in from 1960 until his death in 1973. In 1973 Kevin Humphreys was appointed President of New South Wales Rugby League (NSWRL) and Chairman of Australian Rugby League (ARL). Under him State of Origin was introduced.

In 1983 Humphreys was succeeded in these positions by Ken Arthurson. Under Arthurson the clubs in the NSWRL expanded outside the borders of the state and even the country until in 1994, after administering its 87th consecutive premiership season, the NSWRL was replaced by the Australian Rugby League as club football's peak administrative body.

Notwithstanding the hand over of control of the game at the elite level across Australia to the commission, the NSWRL did retain responsibility for both the administration of the New South Wales rugby league team in State of Origin series, as well as day-to-day management of the state-based New South Wales Cup second-tier premiership, as well as junior representative competitions and divisional leagues throughout NSW and the ACT. It does so in conjunction with the NSW Country Rugby League. In a similar way, the rival Queensland Rugby League retained responsibility for that state's Origin team and lower tier competitions.

Royal Agricultural Society Shield
The Royal Agricultural Society Shield, or RAS Shield was the New South Wales Rugby League (NSWRL)'s first premiership trophy. It was presented to each year's premiership winning rugby league team; the first to win three successive titles would take permanent ownership of the shield. The Eastern Suburbs club achieved this feat winning premierships in 1911, 1912 and 1913.

The hand crafted silver and oak designed shield was donated to the NSWRL by the Royal Agricultural Society of New South Wales in its first year of competition.

Leading journalist Claude Corbett wrote in Sydney, Sun, newspaper on, 1 May 1914, "The Royal Agricultural Society Shield, which was presented at the inception of the League's first grade competition has been won outright by Eastern Suburbs, who upset all calculations by winning the premiership three years in succession. The club has presented the shield to their captain, Dally Messenger, 'as a token of appreciation of his captaincy'."

In 1929 Jersey Flegg was appointed to the position of president of the NSWRFL.

Midway through the 1909 season, Edward Larkin was appointed full-time secretary of the NSWRFL.

J.J. Giltinan Shield
In 1951, the NSWRFL originated the J.J. Giltinan Shield, following his death in 1950. This trophy was awarded to the premiers of the NSWRFL competition, being named after one of the founding fathers of the NSWRFL and rugby league in Australia. The trophy remains today, being awarded to the minor premiers of the National Rugby League competition.

Following Jersey Flegg's death in 1960, Bill Buckley was made the NSWRFL's new president.

In 1967 the NSWRFL grand final became the first football grand final of any code to be televised live in Australia. The Nine Network had paid $5,000 for the broadcasting rights.

In 1973 NSWRFL boss Kevin Humphreys negotiated rugby league's first television deal with the Australian Broadcasting Corporation. The NSWRFL had commenced a very popular and successful mid-week competition in 1974, originally known as the Amco Cup, but later as the Tooth Cup and the National Panasonic Cup.  The success of this competition, which included teams from both Brisbane and New Zealand, ultimately created pressure for further expansion in the NSWRFL competition.

In 1980, the NSWRFL President Kevin Humphries, who had been chairman of the League since 1973, was instrumental in the establishment of the State of Origin series between teams representing the NSWRFL and Queensland Rugby League (QRL). The immediate success of this series, which remains the premier representative competition in Australia, and the overriding success of the Queensland team further pressured the NSWRFL to expand the club competition outside the boundaries of the state.

Sydney suburban teams came and went throughout the NSWRFL's history but it was not until 1982 that the competition included expansion outside of the Sydney area.  This corresponded with the adoption of commercial sponsorship of the competition for the first time, the Winfield Cup. The two new inclusions were from the Australian Capital Territory – the Canberra Raiders –  as well as a team from the southern New South Wales region – the Illawarra Steelers.

Winfield Cup

The magnificent Winfield Cup trophy remains a permanent symbol of one of the game's most successful eras. Cast in bronze by Alan Ingham, it was the game's ultimate prize for the duration of the Winfield sponsorship from 1982 to 1995.

Based on John O'Gready's world famous photograph of Norm Provan (St George) and Arthur Summons (Wests) after the 1963 Grand Final, the trophy represented the premiership pinnacle for players in the Winfield Era. Its image of the big man and the little man encompasses many of the finer things about Rugby League – the mateship after battle, the satisfaction of the shared experience on the playing field – no matter how hard and tough the struggle has been, the message that Rugby League, for all its professionalism, is still a game.

The Winfield Cup captured these and many other enduring things about League in its primary image, "The Gladiators" and the famous trophy, like the JJ Giltinan Shield, remains an important part of the game's heritage.

The League's name was changed in 1984 to the New South Wales Rugby League and Ken Arthurson became the new chairman. In 1988, two Queensland teams joined the competition, with the inclusions of the Brisbane Broncos and the Gold Coast-Tweed Giants seeing the game move beyond the outer borders of New South Wales. At the same a team from the Hunter region of New South Wales was included, with the return of a Newcastle franchise. Their return was the end of an 81-year wait in the wilderness and this time around the franchise was badged the Newcastle Knights.

In 1990 the NSWRL introduced a salary cap system to even the playing field of teams in the Winfield Cup.

The Winfield Cup competition was handed over to the control of the Australian Rugby League for the 1995 season, with the inclusion of teams from North Queensland, Western Australia and New Zealand. This period of expansion created tremendous success for the competition and rugby league in general.  Over 3 million fans attended competition matches in the 1995 season and this figure remained the record for a single season attendance until 2009. The 2010 NRL Season now holds the record for highest aggregate attendance, with a total of 3149927.

The Knock On Effect NSW Cup

The Knock On Effect NSW Cup (formerly known as NSW Cup, VB NSW Cup, Intrust Super Premiership and Canterbury Cup NSW) is the States's top-tier competition and clubs run as direct feeders to NRL sides. Canterbury of New Zealand have naming rights from Season 2019 to Season 2020.

CRL 
On 24 August 2018, the NSWRL and CRL announced that they had entered into a Memorandum of Understanding (MOU) which will involve formal discussions in relation to a possible merger that would see a merger of the two organisations. This would result with Rugby League in NSW governed by one body for the first time in more than 80 years.

National Rugby League Clubs

New South Wales is home to the following National Rugby League teams:

Current Competitions

Statewide/Representative

Open age 
 Knock on effect NSW Cup
 NSW Women's Premiership
 Presidents Cup
 NSW Challenge Cup

Age-based 
 Jersey Flegg Cup (U20s)
 S.G. Ball Cup (U18s)
 Laurie Daley Cup (U18s)
 Tarsha Gale Cup (Women's U18s)
 Harold Matthews Cup (U16s)
 Andrew Johns Cup (U16s)

Metropolitan
 Ron Massey Cup
 Sydney Shield
 Macarthur Division Rugby League
 Sydney Combined - Northern Open Age (Manly/Norths/Balmain)
 Sydney Combined - South Eastern Open Age (Cronulla/St George)
 Sydney Combined - Central West Open Age (Canterbury/Parramatta)
 Penrith District Rugby League
 South Sydney A Grade

Country

Region 1 – North Coast Bulldogs/Northern Rivers Titans
Northern Rivers Division (Group 1 and 18's Merger)*
Group 2 (Northern Mid North Coast)*
Group 3 (Southern Mid North Coast)*
Hastings League (Mid North Coast Division 2)

Region 2 – Greater Northern Tigers
Group 4 (Western New England)*
Group 19 (New England)*
Group 21 (Hunter)*

Region 3 – Bidgee Bulls/Monaro Colts (Riverina & Monaro)
Canberra Division (Formerly Group 8)*
Group 9 (Wagga Wagga and Districts)*
Group 16 (Far South Coast)*
Group 17 (Western Riverina Community Cup)
Group 20 (Griffith and Districts)*
George Tooke Shield (Canberra District Division 2)

Region 4 – Western Rams
Peter McDonald Premiership (Groups 10 & 11 First Grade)*
Group 10 (Central West)
Group 11 (Dubbo and Districts)
Group 12 (Outback RL)
Group 14 (Castlereagh Cup)
Group 15 (Barwon Darling RL)
Woodbridge Cup (Central West Division 2)
Mid West Cup (Central West Division 3)

Region 5 – Greater Southern (Illawarra-South Coast Dragons)
Illawarra Division*
Group 7 (South Coast & Southern Highlands)*

Region 6 – NMR Knights/Central Coast Roosters (Newcastle & Central Coast)
Central Coast Division*
Newcastle Division*
Newcastle & Hunter Rugby League

* = Top-level Country leagues; Premiers eligible for Clayton Cup as best regional team in the state.

Representative

The NSWRL manages the New South Wales State of Origin team as well the NSW Residents, Jim Beam Cup, under-19s, under-17s and under-16s and Indigenous rugby league teams. These teams traditionally play against teams from the Queensland Rugby League.

City vs Country is an annual match that takes place between a City side selected by the NSWRL and a Country side selected by New South Wales Country Rugby League. It is played before the State of Origin series and is often referred to as a selection trial for the New South Wales Blues team.

The annual State of Origin series between the New South Wales Blues and the Queensland Maroons is the most popular sporting event in NSW. Sydney has hosted many State of Origin matches since the series began in 1980. The three-game series are held in Sydney and Brisbane with the first and third games in one city and the second in the other. These rotate every year, so if two games are played in Sydney one year, then those games are played in Brisbane the next.

Other activities

The NSWRL conducts a development academy from the NSW Institute of Sport facility at Narrabeen. This facility is actively involved in the conduct of competitions and carnivals involving junior league and schools based teams. The academy also conducts several camps, focusing on development as well as running the accreditation process for coaches, trainers, first aid and match officials.

Radio coverage is presented by Steele Sports who call two games of the Intrust Super Premiership each weekend. Steele Sports includes a large team from across Sydney: Alby Talarico (founder), Curtis Woodward (lead caller), Daniel Pettigrew (lead caller), Jack Clifton, Keith 'The chairman' Payne, Tony Dosen, Lewis Shepperd, Luke Potter and Matt French.

Hawkesbury Radio call Penrith Panthers matches while Alive FM call selected Wentworthville games.

See also

 Australian Rugby League
 Rugby league in New South Wales
 National Rugby League
 Country Rugby League
 New South Wales Rugby League premiership
 Queensland Rugby League
 State of Origin series
 Super League (Australia)
 New South Wales Cup

References

Further reading

External links

Rugby League clubs in New South Wales

1907 establishments in Australia
Sports organizations established in 1907
Rugby League
New South Wales